Dry Lake is a lake in the U.S. state of Nevada.

Dry Lake was named for the fact its bed most often is dry.

References

Lakes of Esmeralda County, Nevada